Abigail "Abby" Donnelly (born July 23, 2002) is an American actress, having appeared in American Horror Story (2012), Suburgatory (2013), Criminal Minds (2016). She a main role of Darbie O'Brien in Just Add Magic, Lizzie McGrath in Malibu Rescue (2019-2020) and as a Morgan in the short film Confiding in Brother (2020).

Early life
Abby Donnelly was born on July 23, 2002 in California, U.S.

Career
Donnelly started her television career in 2012, as Peggy Cartwright in American Horror Story alongside Sarah Paulson and Chloë Sevigny. and as Jenni in Suburgatoryin 2013. She also played Helen McGill in Criminal Minds in 2016. The same year she landed a main role in the Amazon Prime show Just Add Magic with Olivia Sanabia and Aubrey K. Miller. She played Darbie O'Brien for three seasons and 52 episodes from 2016 to 2019. She later appeared in two episodes of the  spin-off show Just Add Magic: Mystery City during 2020. From 2019 to 2020, she plays Lizzie McGrath in the series Malibu Rescue: The Series,  and it's two films Malibu Rescue: The Movie ((2019) and Malibu Rescue: The Next Wave.

Filmography

References

External links
 

Living people
2002 births
21st-century American women
Actresses from California
American child actresses
American film actresses
American television actresses